Margaret of Hohenzollern-Nuremberg (1367-1406) was a daughter of Burgrave Frederick V of Nuremberg and his wife, Elisabeth of Meissen.

In 1383 in Kulmbach, she married Landgrave Herman II of Hesse, as his second wife.  They had the following children:
 Anna (1385–1386)
 Henry (1387–1394)
 Elisabeth (1388–1394)
 Margarete ( 1389–1446), married to Henry I of Brunswick-Lüneburg
 Agnes (1391–1471), married to Otto II of Brunswick-Göttingen
 Hermann (1396–1406)
 Frederick (1398–1402)
 Louis (1402–1458), succeeded as Landgrave of Hesse

Landgravines of Hesse
1367 births
1406 deaths
14th-century German nobility
House of Hohenzollern
Daughters of monarchs